Fugit Township is one of nine townships in Decatur County, Indiana. As of the 2010 census, its population was 1,767 and it contained 846 housing units.

History
Fugit Township was organized in 1822.

Geography

Unincorporated towns
 Clarksburg
 Kingston
 Saint Maurice
(This list is based on USGS data and may include former settlements.)

Adjacent townships
 Richland Township, Rush County (north)
 Posey Township, Franklin County (northeast)
 Salt Creek Township, Franklin County (east)
 Ray Township, Franklin County (southeast)
 Salt Creek Township (south)
 Washington Township (southwest)
 Clinton Township (west)
 Anderson Township, Rush County (northwest)

Cemeteries
The township contains two cemeteries: Memorial and Mount Carmel.

References
 
 United States Census Bureau cartographic boundary files

External links

 Indiana Township Association
 United Township Association of Indiana

Townships in Decatur County, Indiana
Townships in Indiana
1822 establishments in Indiana
Populated places established in 1822